Gleison Wilson da Silva Moreira (born 23 June 1995), known as Gleison, is a Brazilian football player who plays for Angolan club Petro de Luanda.

Club career
He made his professional debut in the Segunda Liga for Portimonense on 1 March 2015 in a game against Farense.

He made his Primeira Liga debut for Paços de Ferreira on 13 August 2016, when he was a starter in a 1–1 draw against Moreirense.

References

External links

1995 births
Sportspeople from Campinas
Living people
Brazilian footballers
Association football forwards
Portimonense S.C. players
FC Porto B players
F.C. Paços de Ferreira players
F.C. Penafiel players
S.C. Covilhã players
Atlético Petróleos de Luanda players
Primeira Liga players
Liga Portugal 2 players
Brazilian expatriate footballers
Expatriate footballers in Portugal
Brazilian expatriate sportspeople in Portugal
Expatriate footballers in Angola
Brazilian expatriate sportspeople in Angola